The 2015 Northeast Conference men's basketball tournament was held on March 4, 7, and 10. The tournament featured the league's top eight seeds, with higher seed hosting all games.  The tourney opened on Wednesday, March 4 with the quarterfinals, followed by the semifinals on Saturday, March 7 and the finals on Tuesday, March 10. Robert Morris earned the conference's automatic bid to the 2015 NCAA tournament.

Format
For the eleventh straight year, the NEC Men's Basketball Tournament consisted of an eight-team playoff format with all games played at the home of the higher seed. After the quarterfinals, the teams were shuffled so the highest remaining seed plays the lowest remaining seed in the semifinals.

Seeds
Teams were seeded based on the final regular season standings, with ties broken under NEC policy.

Bracket

All games will be played at the venue of the higher seed* Overtime

Game summaries

Quarterfinals: St. Francis Brooklyn vs. LIU Brooklyn
Series History: LIU leads 63-40

Quarterfinals: Mount St. Mary's vs. Saint Francis (PA)
Series History: MSM leads 42-30

Quarterfinals: Robert Morris vs. Wagner
Series History: RMU leads 41-25

Quarterfinals: Bryant vs. Sacred Heart
Series History: SHU leads 18-13
Announcers: Paul Dottino, Joe DeSantis and John Schmeelk

Semifinal: Robert Morris vs. Bryant
Series History: RMU leads 10–2 
Announcers: John Schmeelk and Tim Capstraw

Semifinal: St. Francis Brooklyn vs. Saint Francis (PA)
Series History: SFU leads 36–38
Announcers: Paul Dottino, Joe DeSantis and Matt Harmon

Championship: St. Francis Brooklyn vs. Robert Morris
Series History: 43–27 
Announcers: John Brickley and Craig Robinson

All-tournament team
Tournament MVP in bold.

References

Northeast Conference men's basketball tournament
Tournament
Northeast Conference men's basketball tournament
Northeast Conference men's basketball tournament